From Other Worlds is a 2004 American science fiction comedy film written and directed by Barry Strugatz and starring Cara Buono, Isaach de Bankolé, David Lansbury, Robert Peters, Melissa Leo and Joel de la Fuente.

Cast
Cara Buono as Joanne Schwartzbaum
Isaach de Bankolé as Abraham
Melissa Leo as Miriam
Joel de la Fuente as Alien
David Lansbury as Brian Schwartzbaum
Robert Peters as Steve
Paul Lazar as Larry
Laurie Esterman as Psychiatrist
Robert Downey Sr. as Baker

Reception
On review aggregator website Rotten Tomatoes, the film has an approval rating of 38% based on 13 critics, with an average rating of 5.4/10. On Metacritic, From Other Worlds holds a rank of 43 out of a 100 based on 7 critics, indicating "mixed or average reviews".

Nick Schager of Slant Magazine awarded the film one and a half stars out of four. Scott Tobias of The A.V. Club graded the film a C+. Robert Koehler of Variety gave the film a positive review, calling it an "amiable and arch comedy".

References

External links

2004 science fiction films
2004 comedy films
American science fiction comedy films
2000s English-language films
2000s American films